"Fair Game" is the season premiere of the sixth season of the American television drama series Homeland, and the 61st episode overall. It premiered on Showtime on January 15, 2017.

Plot 
Sekou Bah (J. Mallory McCree), a young black Muslim-American, posts a series of videos online where he visits locations of past domestic terrorist attacks and chronicles what happened. He is arrested by FBI Special Agent Ray Conlin (Dominic Fumusa) and charged with materially supporting terrorism. Carrie (Claire Danes), now heading up a non-profit organization in New York City that defends the rights of Muslim-Americans against discrimination, meets Sekou and prepares to represent him. Conlin reveals to Carrie that they found Sekou in possession of plane tickets to Nigeria, the base of operations of Boko Haram, and $5,000 in cash hidden under his mattress.

Carrie visits Peter Quinn (Rupert Friend) at a veteran's hospital where he is rehabilitating from his exposure to sarin gas in Berlin. Quinn exhibits signs of PTSD and partial paralysis. They get into an argument when Carrie learns that Quinn skipped a physical therapy appointment. When Quinn is reported missing the next day, Carrie tracks him down to a flophouse where he has been smoking crack and having sex with prostitutes, and finds him with a head wound after being mugged for his government check. When Quinn violently resists being readmitted to the hospital, Carrie reluctantly agrees to let him stay with her and Franny, albeit in her downstairs apartment.

Saul Berenson (Mandy Patinkin) and Dar Adal (F. Murray Abraham) brief President-elect Elizabeth Keane (Elizabeth Marvel) on ongoing CIA operations. After the briefing, Dar expresses concern to Saul that Keane might be planning to demilitarize the CIA, noting that Keane's son was killed while serving in Iraq. Saul is more amenable to Keane's point of view. Dar covertly meets Tovah Rivlin (Hadar Ratzon-Rotem) of Mossad and suggests that certain initiatives should be accelerated before Keane's inauguration, only eight weeks away. As the episode concludes, Dar Adal hosts a meeting with General McClendon (Robert Knepper), Senator Coto (Alfredo Narciso) and other officials. Dar and Coto have decided to not include Saul.

Production 
The episode was directed by Keith Gordon, and co-written by showrunner Alex Gansa and co-executive producer Ted Mann.

Reception

Reviews 
The episode received a rating of 100% with an average score of 7.2 out of 10 on the review aggregator Rotten Tomatoes, with the site's consensus stating "Although Homelands premiere episode lacks the show's signature thrills and gimmicks, 'Fair Game' effectively sets the table for future improvement, establishing a powerful sense of time and place and nuanced character moments throughout."

Brian Tallerico of New York Magazine rated the episode 4 out of 5 stars, saying it had "a pleasantly slow pace... it's an interesting tone-setter for a show that can often be detrimentally hyperactive". In praise of the episode's scenery, Tallerico wrote "The premiere used New York City beautifully, especially in the bustling background behind Sekou's videos"

Matt Brennan of Paste reviewed it positively, calling it "uneventful", but stating "despite its dearth of narrative fireworks, tonight’s episode succeeds in setting the table for such developments on two distinct fronts".

Rupert Friend was named "Performer of the Week" by TVLine for his performance; they wrote "it’s a credit to Friend’s raw, riveting performance that he’s making Quinn’s descent so authentic—and tragic".

Ratings 
The original broadcast drew 1.1 million viewers. In addition, 1.25 million people watched the premiere in advance via Showtime's on-demand services.

References

External links 

 "Fair Game" at Showtime
 

2017 American television episodes
Homeland (season 6) episodes
Television episodes directed by Keith Gordon